The 1899 CAHL season was the inaugural season of the Canadian Amateur Hockey League. Teams played an eight-game schedule. The Montreal Shamrocks were the league champion with a record of seven wins and one loss. Both the Shamrocks and the Montreal Victorias won Stanley Cup challenges to retain the Stanley Cup for the league.

Season

Highlights 
The January 26 game between Montreal and Quebec was protested because it was alleged that the referee, Fred Chittick, Ottawa's goalkeeper, was drunk. The game was rescheduled for February 14, to be played in Ottawa, but in the end, Quebec declined to play the game.

On February 4, when Shamrocks defeated Quebec at Montreal by a score of 13–4, Harry Trihey scored 10 goals.

The Victorias defeated Ottawa at Montreal on February 11, by a score of 16–0. Fred Chittick attempted to score by himself, rushing the length of the ice from his net, without success.

The race for the championship was decided on March 1 when Shamrocks defeated the Victorias 1–0. Eight thousand people are recorded as being in attendance, thousands of dollars was wagered and Harry Trihey of Shamrocks scored the deciding goal.

After losing their first six matches, Quebec withdrew from the rest of the schedule, forfeiting their last two games.

Final standing

Exhibitions 
During the season, the Shamrocks travelled to New York City to play two games against the New York Hockey Club. After the season, the Shamrocks travelled to Nova Scotia and New Brunswick to play exhibitions. On March 7, the Shamrocks played the Halifax Crescents to a 1–1 draw, and on March 9, defeated the Crescents 4–2. On March 10, the Shamrocks played the Saint John Mohawks in Saint John, New Brunswick, defeating the Mohawks by a 5–0 score.

The Victorias travelled to New York City to play the Brooklyn Skating Club. The Victorias defeated Brooklyn 5–2 on March 10 at St. Nicholas Rink. The Shamrocks, after the Cup challenge of Queen's, travelled to New York. On March 16, the Shamrocks defeated the All-New-York team 5–2. The Shamrocks then played Brooklyn on March 18, winning over Brooklyn 9–7.

Stanley Cup challenges

Victorias vs. Winnipeg 

Montreal received another challenge from the MHA's Winnipeg Victorias. This time, it was decided that they would play a two-game total goals series in February 1899.

The first game was won by Montreal 2–1. Winnipeg's captain Dan Bain injured his eye and did not play in the second game due to hemorrhaging behind the eye.

The second game ended in controversy. With Montreal leading the game 3–2 with about 12 minutes left in the game, Montreal's Bob MacDougall violently slashed Winnipeg's Tony Gingras. As Gingras was carried off the ice, referee Bill Findlay only called Macdougall for a two-minute minor. Angry that he should have been accessed a larger penalty, Winnipeg went into their dressing room in protest. Insulted, Findlay abruptly went home, but returned after officials followed him on a sleigh and persuaded him to return. Once back at the rink, the referee gave Winnipeg 15 minutes to return to the ice themselves. They refused and thus Findlay disqualified the team and declared Montreal the winners. 4,000 were attending the Winnipeg Auditorium rink to hear returns of the game by telegraph.

The Stanley Cup passed from the Montreal Victorias to the Montreal Shamrocks as champions of the league March 4, 1899.

Shamrocks vs. Queens 

The Shamrocks defended the trophy against Queen's University of Kingston, Ontario. The game was played half under Ontario rules and half under CAHL rules.

Schedule and results 

† Montreal refused to continue with 12 minutes to play. Game was to be replayed on February 14, but Quebec declined and the game was defaulted.

†† Shamrocks clinch league championship.

‡ defaulted to Ottawa

¿ defaulted to Victorias

Player statistics

Goaltending averages 
Note GP = Games played, GA = Goals against, SO = Shutouts, GAA = Goals against average

Leading scorers 
Note: GP = Games played, G = Goals scored

Stanley Cup engravings

1899 Montreal Victorias

1899 Montreal Shamrocks

See also 
 List of Stanley Cup challenge games
 List of Stanley Cup champions

References 

 Bibliography
 
 

Canadian Amateur Hockey League seasons
CAHL